Allan-Axel Kimbaloula (born 1 January 1992) is a professional footballer who plays as a midfielder for Belgian club KSV Oudenaarde. Born in France, he has represented the Congo national team.

Club career
Kimbaloula joined Lille OSC when he was nine, but left the team in summer 2012 without making a first team appearance. In January 2013 he signed a two-year contract with defending Estonian club Nõmme Kalju, having rejected a contract offer from English Premier League side Norwich City.

Ahead of the 2019–20 season, Kimbaloula joined Belgian Second Amateur Division side KSV Oudenaarde. In January 2020, he moved back to France and joined Régional 1 club Olympique Grande-Synthe. In the summer 2020, Kimbaloula returned to Acren Lessines.

International career
Born in France to Cameroonian mother and Congolese father, Kimbaloula was eligible to play for any of these three countries, choosing the latter. On 17 February 2014, he made his international debut for the Congo national team in a 2015 Africa Cup of Nations qualification match against Namibia.

Career statistics

References

External links
 
 

1992 births
Living people
Sportspeople from Tourcoing
Footballers from Hauts-de-France
Association football midfielders
French sportspeople of Cameroonian descent
French sportspeople of Republic of the Congo descent
Republic of the Congo people of Cameroonian descent
French footballers
Republic of the Congo footballers
Republic of the Congo international footballers
Lille OSC players
Nõmme Kalju FC players
Meistriliiga players
Liga II players
Championnat National 2 players
CS Sportul Snagov players
ACS Foresta Suceava players
Kallithea F.C. players
Olympique Grande-Synthe players
Republic of the Congo expatriate footballers
Republic of the Congo expatriate sportspeople in Estonia
Republic of the Congo expatriate sportspeople in Romania
Republic of the Congo expatriate sportspeople in Greece
Republic of the Congo expatriate sportspeople in Belgium
French expatriate sportspeople in Estonia
French expatriate sportspeople in Romania
French expatriate sportspeople in Greece
French expatriate sportspeople in Belgium
Expatriate footballers in Estonia
Expatriate footballers in Romania
Expatriate footballers in Greece
Expatriate footballers in Belgium